Poland competed at the 1997 World Championships in Athletics in Athens, Greece, from 1 – 10 August 1997.

Medalists

Sources 

Nations at the 1997 World Championships in Athletics
World Championships in Athletics
Poland at the World Championships in Athletics